Harold Lamar Shaw (born September 3, 1974) was a professional American football fullback and occasional linebacker with the New England Surge of the Continental Indoor Football League. Shaw attended University of Southern Mississippi and played in the National Football League with the New England Patriots.

New England Patriots
Shaw was drafted in the 6th round of the 1998 NFL Draft by the Patriots. Shaw was on the roster of New England from 1998–2000, where he rushed the ball 18 times for 35 yards and caught 4 passes for 42 yards and no touchdowns. He acted primarily as a blocking fullback during that time period. Shaw left the Patriots after 2000 and did not play in the NFL again.

Post-NFL
In 2001 and 2002, Shaw played fullback and linebacker for the Grand Rapids Rampage of the Arena Football League. With the Rampage, Shaw ran the ball 9 times for 34 yards a 1 touchdown. He also made 2 tackles. Shaw was also seen playing in the NEFL for the Ocean State Vipers in 2009, and for the Brockton Bucs of the EFl in 2007

In 2007, Shaw reappeared in professional football, this time with the New England Surge of the CIFL.

References

External links
 Harold Shaw at ArenaFan Online

1974 births
Living people
People from Magee, Mississippi
Players of American football from Mississippi
American football fullbacks
American football linebackers
Southern Miss Golden Eagles football players
New England Patriots players
Grand Rapids Rampage players